Jacek Jan Krupa (born 11 April 1955 in Skawina) is a Polish politician. He was elected to the Sejm on 2005 parliamentary election, getting 6860 votes in 13 Kraków district from the Civic Platform list. Krupa remained in parliament until his defeat in the 2011 parliamentary election.

In 2012, Krupa was appointed to the Executive Board of Lesser Poland, and in 2014 local elections, won a seat in the Lesser Poland Regional Assembly. He was elected as the Marshal of Lesser Poland on 5 November 2015, becoming the fifth head of the regional government for the province. However, the opposition Law and Justice party challenged Krupa's appointment as marshal as illegal, arguing that the previous marshal, along with his board, had yet to submit their resignations before Krupa's appointment. However, the claim was rejected by the marshal's office.

See also
Members of Polish Sejm 2005-2007
Members of Polish Sejm 2007-2011

References

External links
Jacek Krupa - parliamentary page - includes declarations of interest, voting record, and transcripts of speeches.

Members of the Polish Sejm 2005–2007
Civic Platform politicians
1955 births
Living people
Members of the Polish Sejm 2007–2011
Kraków University of Economics alumni
Voivodeship marshals of Poland
Lesser Poland Voivodeship